Adana Demirspor Kulübü is a Turkish multi-sports club based in Adana, Turkey. The club competes in football, water polo, racquet sports and martial arts. It was founded by railway workers of Turkish State Railways (TCDD) in 1940.  The football team's success at the Adana League and the water polo team's unbeaten National League titles in the first three decades, built a large worker fan base in the city and attracted landowners to finance the club. The club has a intercity rivalry with Adanaspor, which was founded by former supporters unhappy with the management of the club in 1954 and competition among the two clubs for the citywide support and domination, created one of the fiercest rivalries of Turkish football which continues to this day as the Adana derby.

Adana Demirspor was the first club based outside of Istanbul, Ankara, and İzmir to join the National Football League in the 1960-1961 season, before this the league games were only hosted in the three cities. The club was promoted to the top flight in the 1960-61 season and are currently playing their 19th season. Water polo team are the first champions of the Turkish Water Polo League and had dominated the first three decades of the league, winning 21 league titles in 25 years, from early 1940s to mid 1960s.

Adana Demirspor are by far the most successful of the 38 Demirspor clubs that are founded by the employees of the Turkish State Railways (TCDD). Most Demirspor clubs have jersey colours identical to Adana Demirspor, and bear the TCDD symbol on their logo. Ankara Demirspor are the only other Demirspor club that compete in the Turkish professional football league system, and the only ones that are still affiliated with TCDD.

The club did not have a major title in the last 40 years, the highest spot the club has attained in the Turkish top-flight was sixth place, have been away from Süper Lig for 26 years, have never participated in European Cups, have had less success then their archrival including the derby games; though the level of support grew rapidly almost every decade. This was mainly attributed to the worker dominated fan base, who, by seeing themselves as the true owner, sustain the club as a community club and carried further to be more than a club. A significant portion of the fan base is politically left leaning.

History 
The foundation of Adana Demirspor was first laid down in 1938 by Eşref Demirağ, Vasfı Ramzan, Hasan Silah, Hikmet Tezel, Feridun Kuzeybay, Seha Keyder, Emin Ersan, Esat Gürkan, and Kenan Gülgün from TCDD. The club was formally founded on 28 December 1940 with the help of over five hundred employees of TCDD. Adana Demirspor competed in the Adana Football League along with the Cilician clubs; Mersin İdman Yurdu, Tarsus İdman Yurdu, Torosspor, Seyhanspor, and Milli Mensucat. Demirspor won the league a record 15 times between 1942 and 1959. They also won the Turkish Amateur Championship in 1954 against Hacettepe. The match finished 1–0, with Selami Tekkazancı scoring the only goal.

Before 1959, Turkey did not have a national professional league. Instead, teams competed in regional amateur leagues in cities such as Adana, Ankara, Eskişehir, İzmir, Kayseri, and Trabzon. The Milli Lig, known today as the Süper Lig, was created in 1959. The league consisted of eight clubs from Istanbul, and four clubs each from Ankara and İzmir. When Adana Demirspor joined the Milli Lig in 1960, they became the first club from outside the three major football cities to compete. However, their stay didn't last long, as they finished last place with 18 points in their first season due to playing their home matches in Ankara. The club returned to the Adana League, where they competed until 1963. The 2.Lig (Second Division) was created at the start of the 1963–64 season. Adana Demirspor were allowed to compete in the league, and placed second in their first season. Demirspor competed in the 2. Lig for nine years before gaining promotion back to the 1. Lig for the first time since the 1960–61 season. They secured promotion after defeating Uşakspor 2–0, with goals from Fatih Terim and Bektaş Yurttasın.

Adana Demirspor reached the finals of the 1977–78 Turkish Cup. At the time, the final was played over two legs. Demirspor lost the first leg 3–0, and failed to make a comeback in the second leg, drawing 0–0 with Trabzonspor. They met Trabzonspor in a cup final once more that year, this time in the Prime Minister's Cup, but would go on to lose 2–1. Their stay in the top-flight continued through 1984, and reached its apex when the club finished sixth in the 1981–82 season. Since then, Demirspor have failed to match their success. They spent the next several years moving back and forth between the 1. Lig and 2. Lig. Their last season of top-flight football came in 1994–95. The club finished with 15 points, their lowest point total ever in the 1. Lig. Adana Demirspor reached their lowest point professionally in 1999 when they were relegated to the 3. Lig (Third Division before the 2001–02 season). The club spent two years in the 3. Lig before gaining promotion to the newly created 2. Lig. The 2. Lig became the 1. Lig and the 1. Lig became the Süper Lig in 2001. Adana Demirspor competed in the 2. Lig from 2004 to 2012, before returning to First League after winning promotion play-offs.

After completing the 1. Lig as the leader in the 2020–2021 season, Demirspor was promoted to the Süper Lig after 26 years. The club finished the 2021-2022 season as 9th in the Süper Lig.

Stadium and facilities

Adana Demir's homeground is the New Adana Stadium since March 2021. The stadium has a capacity of 33,543 seats. The stadium's north seats are painted to Adana Demirspor's jersey colors and south seats are painted to Adanaspor's jersey colors. Şimşekler group gather at the North Stand, other fan groups tend to gather at the northern section of the East Stands. From 1940 to 2021, the football team played their home games at the now defunct 5 Ocak Stadium. The waterpolo team played their home games at the Atatürk Swimming Complex from 1940 to dissolution. Menderes Sports Hall hosted club's basketball and volleyball teams.

Adana Demir's main training ground is the "Adana Demirspor Tesisleri", along the Seyhan river bank in the Yüreğir district. The training ground was built by the Metropolitan Municipality on a state land in early 2000s. It was named the Aytaç Durak Tesisleri to honour the long-time serving mayor of Adana, who lead the construction of the training ground. As it was built on a state land without a tenancy agreement, Milli Emlak (en:National Property Foundation) sent an eviction notice several times in late 2010s. In March 2019, with the efforts of the Adana MP Jülide Sarıeroğlu, a tenancy agreement is finally made between ADS and the Milli Emlak which secured the training ground for a long-term and at the same time the facility is renamed the Adana Demirspor Tesisleri. The main training ground hosts the club's Head Office and is made of 4 football fields, Club store, fitness center, swimming pool and the staff-player residences.

Adana Demir youth teams train at the TCDD owned training ground at the Central railway station in Kurtuluş, Seyhan. The property, which is composed of a football field and Youth Office, is rented out to Adana Demir for free. ADS Club Museum which is next to the TCDD training ground, was the club's Head Office from 1940 to 2000. Adana Demir has three club stores, one at the main training ground, one at M1 mall and one at the Park Adana mall. The club store at the 5 Ocak Stadium in Reşatbey, moved a little further and is now ran by the supporter group, Şimşekler.

Support and rivalries

Adana Demirspor draw support from all over the city and as well as from the districts of the Adana Province. As being founded as a railway club, they are supported by the railway workers in Turkey. Politically left leaning people also have sympathy for the club.

The main supporters group is called Mavi Şimşekler, which translates to Blue lightnings.
The fans are known to have a left-wing political stance, as result they have good relations with other left-wing teams such as Livorno and St Pauli. The archrivals are Adanaspor, who share the New Adana Stadium with Adana Demirspor.

Current squad

Football
Football department is the only department that survived the whole history of the club. The department is administered by the Sporting Director Gökhan Göktürk. Vincenzo Montella is the Head Coach of the professional team and Özgür Zengin is the Head of Academy Coaching.

Current squad

Other players under contract

Out on loan

Current technical staff

 Last updated: 28 November 2021
 Source:Technical staff

League affiliation
 Adana Football League: 1941–1960, 1961–1963
Turkish Football League: 1960–61, 1963–
 First Tier (Süper Lig): 1960–61, 1973–1984, 1987–1990, 1991–92, 1994–95, 2021– 
 Second Tier (1.Lig): 1963–1973, 1984–1987, 1990–91, 1992–1994, 1995–1999, 2002–2004, 2012–2021
 Third Tier (2.Lig): 1999–2002, 2004–2012

Turkish League Spots

Süper Lig Performance

Swimming and water polo
Atatürk Swimming Complex, the largest swimming pool of the time, had opened in Adana in 1938 with the efforts of the Adana Mayor Turhan Cemal Beriker and the Regional Sports Director Rıza Salih Saray. Adana Demirspor formed the swimming and water polo team from 40 youngsters who developed their swimming skills at the irrigation canals in the city. Adana Demir had joined the Turkish Water polo League in 1942, playing their home games at the new complex. From 1942 to 1954, the club had 13 League titles, without losing a game. They had another 8 titles until 1965, bringing the number of league titles to 21. After all this success, Adana Demirspor water polo team has known as Unbeatables, for several decades. Muharrem Gülergin, son of a railway worker, became a legend for the club for his leadership at the water polo team. Erdal Acet broke the record of swimming Canal La Manche (English Channel) in 9 hours and 2 minutes in 1976.

League affiliation 
Turkish Waterpolo League: 38 years/ 1942–1980

Other departments
Adana Demirspor had formed athletics, cycling, swimming, water polo, and football departments with the foundation of the club. In the next decades, wrestling, basketball, and volleyball departments were founded. Currently, the only active department is the football department.

Athletics
Athletics department participated regional competitions from 1940 to 1952. The department had its best ever season 1953–1954 with titles won by the athletes Yıldıray Pagda, Atilla Pinoz, Yavuz Pagda and Turgay Renklikurt, all becoming well known nationally. The club had several team titles and individual titles within the next decade. After an idling period that lasted until 1980, with the re-organizing efforts of Regional Athletics Coach, Hasan Tekin, the club won titles in the next five years.

Basketball
Basketball department was founded by Alaettin Atsal and Demiray Sayılır and have first appeared in Turkish League in 1968. Adana Demirspor have won the Anatolian Cup title at 1969–1970 season and were promoted to the Turkish Basketball First League. The club were promoted to the Basketball Super League at 1972-1973 after winning a highly competitive season. The department had dissolved in 1980s and had re-opened in 2003, competing at the Regional League for some years.

League affiliation
Turkish Basketball League: 1970–1980
 First Tier (Basketbol Süper Ligi): 1973–74, 1975–76
 Second Tier (Türkiye Basketbol Ligi):  1970–73, 1974–1975, 1976–1980

First Tier Performance

Cycling
Cycling agent and coach Ahmet Ecesoy trained cyclists Ertugrul Arlı, Ahmet Avcılar, İbrahım Gönül and Erol Berk, all becoming part of the National Cycling Team of Turkey. Cycling department were dissolved in 1983.

Volleyball
The volleyball department were the champions for 5 years in a row, from 1967 to 1972 at the Regional Volleyball League. They were dissolved soon after.

Wrestling
Club directors Şevket Kapulu ve Fevzi Özşahin founded the wrestling department in 1956 by converting part of the clubhouse to a wrestling training center, and making up a team from field wrestlers. Wrestlers of Adana Demirspor competed for the Turkish National Wrestling Team in several events. The Wrestling department of ADS became less active after 1968 and were dissolved within the next decade.

Honours
Adana Football
National Finals
Winners (1) : 1954
Third (2) : 1947, 1951
Adana League
Winners (16) (record): 1942–43, 1943–44, 1944–45, 1945–46, 1946–47, 1947–48, 1948–49, 1949–50, 1950–51, 1951–52, 1952–53, 1953–54, 1954–55, 1956–57, 1957–58, 1958–59
Turkish Football League System
Second Tier (1.Lig)
Winners (4): 1972–73, 1986–87, 1990–91, 2020–21
Playoff winners (1): 1993–94
Third Tier (2.Lig)
 Winners (1): 2001–02, 
Playoff winners (1): 2011–12
Turkish Cup
Runners-up (1): 1977–78
Prime Minister's Cup
Runners-up (1): 1978
Turkish Waterpolo League
Sutopu 1.Lig
Winners (21): 1942, 1943, 1944, 1945, 1946, 1947, 1948, 1949, 1950, 1951, 1952, 1953, 1954, 1956, 1958, 1959, 1960, 1962, 1963, 1964, 1965
Turkish Basketball League 
Second Tier (TBL)
Winners (2): 1972–73, 1974–75

Governance
Adana Demirspor is an incorporated company that will partially open to public. President Murat Sancak holds the majority of the shares. The club were a member-owned sports club until 2021. From 1940 to 1959, the club were directly governed by TCDD.

Notable players
Fatih Terim and Hasan Şaş, two names synonymous with Galatasaray S.K. and the Turkish national team, were born in Adana and began their careers with Adana Demirspor. Terim spent five years at the club before moving to Galatasaray. He became a manager after retiring and won several honours, including the UEFA Cup in 2000, four straight Süper Lig titles, and a semi-final finish in the 2008 UEFA European Football Championship. Şaş spent two years at the club before moving to Ankaragücü in 1995. He was a part of the Turkey squad that finished in third place at the 2002 FIFA World Cup. He also played a part in winning five Süper Lig and three Turkish Cup titles with Galatasaray from 1998 to 2009. Adana Demirspor also produced striker Taner Gülleri.

References
Notes

Citations

External links 

Official website
Adana Demirspor on TFF.org

 
Sport in Adana
Sports clubs in Turkey
Association football clubs established in 1940
Railway association football teams
Sports clubs established in 1940
Water polo clubs in Turkey
1940 establishments in Turkey
Süper Lig clubs